Kenneth James Boswell (16 September 1912 – 20 February 1984) was a New Zealand rower who won a silver medal representing his country at the 1938 British Empire Games.

Biography
Born in Waihi on 16 September 1912, Boswell was the son of Mary Ellen Boswell (née Grant) and David McLaren Boswell, a miner and union member who was involved in the Waihi miners' strike. The family moved to Petone, and Ken Boswell was educated at Petone Technical High School. He played as a forward for the Petone Rugby League Club senior team, and rowed for the Petone Rowing Club.

Boswell was a member of the Wellington provincial representative rowing eight in five seasons between 1934 and 1939, usually in the 6 or 7 seat.

At the 1937 New Zealand Rowing Championships held at Akaroa in February 1937, the Petone four of Jim Clayton (stroke), Albert Hope, Boswell, and John Rigby, coxed by George Burns, won the senior men's coxed four title. The same combination were selected to represent New Zealand in the same event at the 1938 British Empire Games, where they won the silver medal.

Boswell gained two further national rowing titles, winning the men's double sculls at Picton in 1939 and Wellington in 1940, both with Petone clubmate Pat Abbott in the stroke seat.

Boswell died on 20 February 1984, and he was cremated at the North Shore Memorial Park, Albany.

References

1912 births
1984 deaths
People from Waihi
Petone Panthers players
New Zealand male rowers
Rowers at the 1938 British Empire Games
Commonwealth Games silver medallists for New Zealand
Commonwealth Games medallists in rowing
Sportspeople from Waikato
Medallists at the 1938 British Empire Games